The community of Halifax, Nova Scotia was created on 1 April 1996, when the City of Dartmouth, the City of Halifax, the Town of Bedford, and the County of Halifax amalgamated and formed the Halifax Regional Municipality. The former City of Halifax was dissolved, and transformed into the Community of Halifax within the municipality.

History

18th century

The Halifax area has been territory of the Miꞌkmaq since time immemorial. Before contact they called the area around the Halifax Harbour Jipugtug (anglicised as "Chebucto"), meaning Great Harbour. Prior to the establishment of Halifax, the most remarkable event in the region was the fate of the Duc d'Anville Expedition, which led to significant disease and death among the local Miꞌkmaq people. There is evidence that bands would spend the summer on the shores of the Bedford Basin, moving to points inland before the harsh Atlantic winter set in. Examples of Miꞌkmaq habitation and burial sites have been found from Point Pleasant Park to the north and south mainland.

The community was originally inhabited by the Miꞌkmaq. The first European settlers to arrive in the future Halifax region were French, in the early 1600s, establishing the colony of Acadia. The British settled Halifax in 1749, which sparked Father Le Loutre's War. To guard against Miꞌkmaw, Acadian, and French attacks on the new Protestant settlements, British fortifications were erected in Halifax (Citadel Hill) (1749), Bedford (Fort Sackville) (1749), Dartmouth (1750), and Lawrencetown (1754).  St. Margaret's Bay was first settled by French-speaking Foreign Protestants at French Village, Nova Scotia, who migrated from Lunenburg, Nova Scotia, during the American Revolution.  All of these regions were amalgamated into the Halifax Regional Municipality (HRM) in 1996. While all of the regions of HRM developed separately over the last 250 years, their histories have also been intertwined.

Despite the Conquest of Acadia in 1710, no serious attempts were made by Great Britain to colonize Nova Scotia, aside from its presence at Annapolis Royal and Canso. The peninsula was dominated by Catholic Acadians and Miꞌkmaw residents. The British founded Halifax in order to counter the influence of the Fortress of Louisbourg after returning the fortress to French control as part of the Treaty of Aix-la-Chapelle (1748).

The Town of Halifax was founded by the Kingdom of Great Britain under the direction of the Board of Trade under the command of Governor Edward Cornwallis in 1749. The British founding of Halifax and the influx of British Protestant settlers led to Father Le Loutre's War. During the war, Miꞌkmaq and Acadians raided the capital region 13 times.

The first European settlement in the community was an Acadian community at present-day Lawrencetown. These Acadians joined the Acadian Exodus when the British established themselves on Halifax Peninsula. The establishment of the Town of Halifax, named after the British Earl of Halifax, in 1749 led to the colonial capital being transferred from Annapolis Royal.

Father Le Loutre's War

The establishment of Halifax marked the beginning of Father Le Loutre's War.  The war began when Edward Cornwallis arrived to establish Halifax with thirteen transports and a sloop-of-war on June 21, 1749.  By unilaterally establishing Halifax the British were violating earlier treaties with the Miꞌkmaq (1726), which were signed after Father Rale's War. Cornwallis brought along 1,176 settlers and their families. In 1750, the sailing ship Alderney arrived with 151 immigrants. Municipal officials at Halifax decided that these new arrivals should be settled on the eastern side of Halifax Harbour. 

During Father Le Loutre's War, the Miꞌkmaq and Acadians raided in the capital region (Halifax and Dartmouth) twelve times. On September 30, 1749, about forty Miꞌkmaq attacked six men who were in Dartmouth cutting trees.  Four of them were killed on the spot, one was taken prisoner and one escaped. Two of the men were scalped and the heads of the others were cut off. The attack was on the sawmill which was under the command of Major Gilman. Six of his men had been sent to cut wood. Four were killed and one was carried off. The other escaped and gave the alarm.  A detachment of rangers was sent after the raiding party and cut off the heads of two Miꞌkmaq and scalped one. This raid was the first of eight against Dartmouth.

The result of the raid, on October 2, 1749, Cornwallis offered a bounty on the head of every Miꞌkmaq. He set the amount at the same rate that the Miꞌkmaq received from the French for British scalps.  As well, to carry out this task, two companies of rangers raised, one led by Captain Francis Bartelo and the other by Captain William Clapham. These two companies served alongside that of John Gorham's company. The three companies scoured the land around Halifax looking for Miꞌkmaq.

In July 1750, the Miꞌkmaq killed and scalped seven men who were at work in Dartmouth. Four raids were against Halifax Peninsula. The first of these was in July 1750: in the woods on peninsular Halifax, the Miꞌkmaq scalped Cornwallis' gardener, his son, and four others. They buried the son, left the gardener's body exposed, and carried off the other four bodies.

In August 1750, 353 people arrived on Alderney and began the town of Dartmouth. The town was laid out in the autumn of that year.
The following month, on September 30, 1750, Dartmouth was attacked again by the Miꞌkmaq and five more residents were killed.

In October 1750 a group of about eight men went out "to take their diversion; and as they were fowling, they were attacked by the Indians, who took the whole prisoners; scalped ... [one] with a large knife, which they wear for that purpose, and threw him into the sea ..." The next year, on March 26, 1751, the Miꞌkmaq attacked again, killing fifteen settlers and wounding seven, three of which would later die of their wounds. They took six captives, and the regulars who pursued the Miꞌkmaq fell into an ambush in which they lost a sergeant killed. Two days later, on March 28, 1751, Miꞌkmaq abducted another three settlers.

Dartmouth Massacre

The worst of these raids was the Dartmouth Massacre (1751).  Three months after the previous raid, on May 13, 1751, Broussard led sixty Miꞌkmaq and Acadians to attack Dartmouth again, in what would be known as the "Dartmouth Massacre". Broussard and the others killed twenty settlers - mutilating men, women, children and babies - and took more prisoner.  A sergeant was also killed and his body mutilated. They destroyed the buildings. The British returned to Halifax with the scalp of one Miꞌkmaw warrior, however, they reported that they killed six Miꞌkmaw warriors.

In 1751, there were two attacks on blockhouses surrounding Halifax. Miꞌkmaq attacked the North Blockhouse (located at the north end of Joseph Howe Drive) and killed the men on guard. They also attacked near the South Blockhouse (located at the south end of Joseph Howe Drive), at a sawmill on a stream flowing out of Chocolate Lake. They killed two men. (Map of Halifax Blockhouses | Map 2)

In 1753, when Lawrence became governor, the Miꞌkmaq attacked again upon the sawmills near the South Blockhouse on the Northwest Arm, where they killed three British. The Miꞌkmaq made three attempts to retrieve the bodies for their scalps.

Prominent Halifax business person Michael Francklin was captured by a Miꞌkmaw raiding party in 1754 and held captive for three months.

French and Indian War

The town proved its worth as a military base in the French and Indian War (the North American Theatre of the Seven Years' War) as a counter to the French fortress Louisbourg in Cape Breton. Halifax provided the base for the Siege of Louisbourg (1758) and operated as a major naval base for the remainder of the war. On Georges Island (Nova Scotia) in the Halifax harbour, Acadians from the expulsion were imprisoned.

On April 2, 1756, Miꞌkmaq received payment from the Governor of Quebec for twelve British scalps taken at Halifax. Acadian Pierre Gautier, son of Joseph-Nicolas Gautier, led Miꞌkmaw warriors from Louisbourg on three raids against Halifax in 1757. In each raid, Gautier took prisoners or scalps or both. The last raid happened in September and Gautier went with four Miꞌkmaq and killed and scalped two British men at the foot of Citadel Hill.  (Pierre went on to participate in the Battle of Restigouche.)  

By June 1757, the settlers at Lawrencetown had to be withdrawn completely from the settlement of Lawrencetown (established 1754) because the number of Native raids eventually prevented settlers from leaving their houses. In April 1757, a band of Acadian and Miꞌkmaw partisans raided a warehouse at near-by Fort Edward, killing thirteen British soldiers and, after taking what provisions they could carry, setting fire to the building. A few days later, the same partisans also raided Fort Cumberland.  Because of the strength of the Acadian militia and Miꞌkmaw militia, British officer John Knox wrote that "In the year 1757 we were said to be Masters of the province of Nova Scotia, or Acadia, which, however, was only an imaginary possession."  He continues to state that the situation in the province was so precarious for the British that the "troops and inhabitants" at Fort Edward, Fort Sackville and Lunenburg "could not be reputed in any other light than as prisoners."

In nearby Dartmouth, Nova Scotia, in the spring of 1759, there was another Miꞌkmaq attack on Eastern Battery, in which five soldiers were killed. In July 1759, Miꞌkmaq and Acadians killed five British in Dartmouth, opposite McNabb's Island.

After the French conquered St. John's, Newfoundland in June 1762, the success galvanized both the Acadians and Natives. They began gathering in large numbers at various points throughout the province and behaving in a confident and, according to the British, "insolent fashion". Officials were especially alarmed when Natives concentrated close to the two principal towns in the province, Halifax and Lunenburg, where there were also large groups of Acadians. The government organized an expulsion of 1,300 people, shipping them to Boston. The government of Massachusetts refused the Acadians permission to land and sent them back to Halifax.

The most famous event to take place at the Great Pontack (Halifax) was on May 24, 1758, when James Wolfe, who was headquartered on Hollis Street, Halifax, threw a party at the Great Pontack prior to departing for the Siege of Louisbourg (1758). Wolfe and his men purchased 70 bottles of Madeira wine, 50 bottles of claret and 25 bottles of brandy. Four days later, on May 29 the invasion fleet departed. Wolfe returned to his headquarters in Halifax and the Great Pontack before his Battle of the Plains of Abraham. By the end of the year the Sambro Island Lighthouse was constructed at the harbour entrance to develop the port city's merchant and naval shipping. 

A permanent navy base, the Halifax Naval Yard was established in 1759. For much of this period in the early 18th century, Nova Scotia was considered a frontier posting for the British military, given the proximity to the border with French territory and potential for conflict; the local environment was also very inhospitable and many early settlers were ill-suited for the colony's wilderness on the shores of Halifax Harbour. The original settlers, who were often discharged soldiers and sailors, left the colony for established cities such as New York and Boston or the lush plantations of the Virginias and Carolinas. However, the new city did attract New England merchants exploiting the nearby fisheries and English merchants such as Joshua Maugher who profited greatly from both British military contracts and smuggling with the French at Louisbourg. The military threat to Nova Scotia was removed following British victory over France in the Seven Years' War.

With the addition of remaining territories of the colony of Acadia, the enlarged British colony of Nova Scotia was mostly depopulated, following the deportation of Acadian residents. In addition, Britain was unwilling to allow its residents to emigrate, this being at the dawn of their Industrial Revolution, thus Nova Scotia invited settlement by "foreign Protestants".  The region, including its new capital of Halifax, saw a modest immigration boom comprising Germans, Dutch, New Englanders, residents of Martinique and many other areas. In addition to the surnames of many present-day residents of Halifax who are descended from these settlers, an enduring name in the city is the "Dutch Village Road", which led from the "Dutch Village", located in Fairview. Dutch here referring to the German "Deutsch" which sounded like "dutch" to Haligonian ears.

Lawrencetown was raided numerous times during the war and eventually had to be abandoned as a result (1756).  For many decades Dartmouth remained largely rural, lacking direct transportation links to the growing military and commercial presence in Halifax, except for a dedicated ferry service.  The former Halifax County was one of the five original counties of Nova Scotia created by an Order in Council in 1759.

Headquarters of the North American Station

Halifax was the headquarters for the British Royal Navy's North American Station for sixty years (1758–1818). Halifax Harbour had served as a Royal Navy seasonal base from the founding of the city in 1749, using temporary facilities and a careening beach on Georges Island. Land and buildings for a permanent Naval Yard were purchased in 1758 and the yard was officially commissioned in 1759. Land and buildings for a permanent Naval Yard were purchased by the Royal Naval Dockyard, Halifax in 1758 and the Yard was officially commissioned in 1759. (The yard served as the main base for the Royal Navy in North America during the Seven Years' War, the American Revolution, the French Revolutionary Wars and the War of 1812. In 1818 Halifax became the summer base for the squadron which shifted to the Royal Naval Dockyard, Bermuda for the remainder of the year.)

Burying the Hatchet Ceremony
After agreeing to several peace treaties, the seventy-five year period of war ended with the Burial of the Hatchet Ceremony between the British and the Mi'kmaq. On June 25, 1761, a "Burying of the Hatchet Ceremony" was held at Governor Jonathan Belcher's garden on present-day Spring Garden, Halifax in front of the Court House. (In commemoration of these treaties, Nova Scotians annually celebrate Treaty Day on October 1.)

Halifax's fortunes waxed and waned with the military needs of the empire. While it had quickly become the largest Royal Navy base on the Atlantic coast and had hosted large numbers of British army regulars, the complete destruction of Louisbourg in 1760 removed the threat of French attack. With peace in 1763, the garrison and naval squadron was dramatically reduced. With naval vessels no longer carrying the mail, Halifax merchants banded together in 1765 to build Nova Scotia Packet a schooner to carry mail to Boston, later commissioned as the naval schooner , the first warship built in English Canada. Meanwhile, Boston and New England turned their eyes west, to the French territory now available due to the defeat of Montcalm at the Plains of Abraham. By the mid-1770s the town was feeling its first of many peacetime slumps.

The American Revolution

The American Revolutionary War was not at first uppermost in the minds of most residents of Halifax. The government did not have enough money to pay for oil for the Sambro lighthouse.  The militia was unable to maintain a guard, and was disbanded.  The Sugar Act, or American Revenue Act, of April 1764 was the first from the Parliament at Westminster to explicitly state that its purpose was not merely to regulate trade but to raise revenue, and, toward this end, the Act established a vice admiralty court in Halifax for the purpose of cracking down on alleged smugglers evading customs. Provisions were so scarce during the winter of 1775 that Quebec had to send flour to feed the town. While Halifax was remote from the troubles in the rest of the American colonies, martial law was declared in November 1775 to combat lawlessness.

On March 30, 1776, General William Howe arrived, having been driven from Boston by rebel forces. He brought with him 200 officers, 3000 men, and over 4,000 loyalist refugees, and demanded housing and provisions for all. This was merely the beginning of Halifax's role in the war.  Throughout the conflict, and for a considerable time afterwards, thousands more refugees, often "in a destitute and helpless condition" had arrived in Halifax or other ports in Nova Scotia.  This would peak with the evacuation of New York, and continue until well after the formal conclusion of war in 1783.  At the instigation of the newly arrived Loyalists who desired greater local control, Britain subdivided Nova Scotia in 1784 with the creation of the colonies of New Brunswick and Cape Breton Island; this had the effect of considerably diluting Halifax's presence over the region.

During the American Revolution, Halifax became the staging point of many attacks on rebel-controlled areas in the Thirteen Colonies, and was the city to which British forces from Boston and New York were sent after the over-running of those cities. After the War, tens of thousands of United Empire Loyalists from the American colonies flooded Halifax, and many of their descendants still reside in the city today.

Dartmouth continued to develop slowly. In 1785, at the end of the American Revolution, a group of Quakers from Nantucket arrived in Dartmouth to set up a whaling trade. They built homes, a Quaker meeting house, a wharf for their vessels and a factory to produce spermaceti candles and other products made from whale oil and carcasses. It was a profitable venture and the Quakers employed many local residents, but within ten years, around 1795, the whalers moved their operation to Wales. Only one Quaker residence remains in Dartmouth and is believed to be the oldest structure in Dartmouth. Other families soon arrived in Dartmouth, among them was the Hartshorne family. They were Loyalists who arrived in 1785, and received a grant that included land bordering present-day Portland, King and Wentworth Streets. Woodlawn was once part of the land purchased by a Loyalist, named Ebenezer Allen who became a prominent Dartmouth businessman. In 1786, he donated land near his estate to be used as a cemetery. Many early settlers are interred in the Woodlawn cemetery including the remains of the "Babes in the Woods," two sisters who wandered into the forest and perished.

Prince Edward, Duke of Kent and Strathearn

Prince Edward, Duke of Kent and Strathearn was ordered to live in at the headquarters of the Royal Navy's, North American Station in Halifax (1794–1800). He became the Commander-in-Chief, North America. He had a significant impact on the city. He was instrumental in shaping that port's military defences for protecting the important Royal Navy base, as well as influencing the city's and colony's socio-political and economic institutions.  He also designed the Prince of Wales Tower, the Halifax Town Clock on Citadel Hill (Fort George), St Georges (Round) Church, Princes Lodge (only the round music room remains) and others. The Prince and his mistress, Madame de Saint-Laurent, lived at Prince's Lodge for the six years they stationed in Halifax. (The Duke visited Kings County, Nova Scotia in 1794. As a result, in 1826, the inhabitants of the county voted to name their town Kentville after him). While in Halifax he was promoted to lieutenant-general in January 1796.

Not until after suffering a fall from his horse in late 1798 was he allowed to return to England. On April 24, 1799, he was created Duke of Kent and Strathearn  and Earl of Dublin, received the thanks of parliament and an income of £12,000 and was later, in May, promoted to the rank of general and appointed Commander-in-Chief of British forces in North America. He took leave of his parents on July 22, 1799 and sailed to Halifax. Just over twelve months later he left Halifax and arrived in England on August 31, 1800 where it was expected his next appointment would be Lord Lieutenant of Ireland.

19th century

By the early 19th century, Dartmouth consisted of about twenty-five families. Within twenty years, there were sixty houses, a church, gristmill, shipyards, sawmill, two inns and a bakery located near the harbour.

Napoleonic Wars
Halifax was now the bastion of British strength on the East Coast of North America. Local merchants also took advantage of the exclusion of American trade to the British colonies in the Caribbean, beginning  a long trade relationship with the West Indies. However, the most significant growth began with the beginning of what would become known as the Napoleonic Wars. Military spending and the opportunities of wartime shipping and trading stimulated growth led by local merchants such as Charles Ramage Prescott and Enos Collins. By 1796, Prince Edward, Duke of Kent, was sent to take command of Nova Scotia. Many of the city's forts were designed by him, and he left an indelible mark on the city in the form of many public buildings of Georgian architecture, and a dignified British feel to the city itself. It was during this time that Halifax truly became a city.  Many landmarks and institutions were built during his tenure, from the Town Clock on Citadel Hill to St. George's Round Church, fortifications in the Halifax Defence Complex were built up, businesses established, and the population boomed. At the same time, the towns people and especially seafarers were constantly on-guard of the press gangs of the Royal Navy.

Halifax Impressment Riot

The Royal Navy's manning problems in Nova Scotia peaked in 1805. Warships were short-handed from high desertion rates, and naval captains were handicapped in filling those vacancies by provincial impressment regulations. Desperate for sailors, the Royal Navy pressed them all over the North Atlantic region in 1805, from Halifax and Charlottetown to Saint John and Quebec City. In early May, Vice Admiral Andrew Mitchell sent press gangs from several warships into downtown Halifax. They conscripted men first and asked questions later, rounding up dozens of potential recruits.

Wentworth lashed out at the admiral for sparking urban unrest and breaking provincial impressment laws, and his government exploited this violent episode to put even tighter restrictions of recruiting in Nova Scotia.

Stemming from impressment disturbances, civil-naval relations deteriorated in Nova Scotia from 1805 to the War of 1812.  was in Liverpool for only about a week, but it terrified the small town the entire time and naval impressment remained a serious threat to sailors along the South Shore. After leaving Liverpool, Whiting terrorized Shelburne by pressing inhabitants, breaking into homes, and forcing more than a dozen families to live in the forest to avoid further harassment.

War of 1812
Though the Duke left in 1800, the city's prosperity continued to grow throughout the Napoleonic Wars and the War of 1812. While the Royal Navy squadron based in Halifax was small at the beginning of the Napoleonic Wars, it grew to a large size by the War of 1812 and ensured that Halifax was never attacked. The Naval Yard in Halifax expanded to become a major base for the Royal Navy and while its main task was supply and refit, it also built several smaller warships including the namesake  in 1806.

Capture of U.S.S. Chesapeake

Several notable naval engagements occurred off the Halifax station. Most dramatic was the victory of the Halifax-based British frigate  which captured the American frigate  and brought her to Halifax as prize. As the first major victory in the naval war for the British, the capture raised the shaken morale of the Royal Navy. Two-thirds of the men that followed British Captain Philip Broke in the boarding party were wounded or killed. The casualties, 228 dead or wounded between the two ships' companies, were high, with the ratio making it one of the bloodiest single ship actions of the age of sail. It had the single highest body count in an action between two ships in the entirety of the war. By comparison,  suffered fewer casualties during the much longer Battle of Trafalgar. 

Shannon, commanded by Halifax's own Provo Wallis, escorted Chesapeake into Halifax, arriving there on June 6. On the entry of the two frigates into the harbour, the naval ships already at anchor manned their yards, bands played martial music and each ship Shannon passed greeted her with cheers.  The 320 American survivors of the battle were interned on Meville Island in 1813, and many later buried at nearby Deadman's Island. The  American ship, renamed HMS Chesapeake, was used to ferry prisoners from Melville to England's Dartmoor Prison. Many American officers were paroled to Halifax, but some began a riot at a performance of a patriotic song about Chesapeakes defeat. Parole restrictions were tightened: beginning in 1814, paroled officers were required to attend a monthly muster on Melville Island, and those who violated their parole were confined to the prison.

As well, an invasion force which attacked Washington D.C. in 1813, and burned the Capitol and White House was sent from Halifax. The leader of the force was Robert Ross, who died in the battle and was buried in Halifax.

Early in the war, an expedition left Halifax under the Lieutenant Governor of Nova Scotia, John Coape Sherbrooke, to captured Maine. They renamed the new colony New Ireland, which the British held for the entirety of the war. The revenues which were taken from this conquest were used after the war to finance a military library in Halifax and to found Dalhousie University which is today Atlantic Canada's largest university. There remains a street on campus called Castine Way, named after Castine, Maine. The city also thrived in the War of 1812 on the large numbers of captured American ships and cargoes captured by the British navy and provincial privateers. The wartime boom peaked in 1814. Present day government landmarks such as Government House, built to house the governor, and Province House, built to house the House of Assembly, were both built during the city's peak of prosperity at the end of the War of 1812.

Saint Mary's University was founded in 1802, originally as an elementary school. Saint Mary's was upgraded to a college following the establishment of Dalhousie University in 1819; both were initially located in the downtown central business district before relocating to the then-outskirts of the city in the south end near the Northwest Arm. Separated by only few minutes walking distance, the two schools now enjoy a friendly rivalry.

Black Refugees

The next major migration of blacks into Nova Scotia occurred between 1813 and 1815. Black Refugees from the United States settled in many parts of Nova Scotia including Hammonds Plains, Beechville, Lucasville and Africville.

19th-century prosperity
In the peace after 1815, the city at first suffered an economic malaise for a few years, aggravated by the move of the Royal Naval yard to Bermuda in 1818. However the economy recovered in the next decade led by a very successful local merchant class. Powerful local entrepreneurs included steamship pioneer Samuel Cunard and the banker Enos Collins. During the 19th century Halifax became the birthplace of two of Canada's largest banks; local financial institutions included the Halifax Banking Company, Union Bank of Halifax, People's Bank of Halifax, Bank of Nova Scotia, and the Merchants' Bank of Halifax, making the city one of the most important financial centres in colonial British North America and later Canada until the beginning of the 20th century. This position was somewhat rivalled by neighbouring Saint John, New Brunswick during the city's economic hey-day in the mid-19th century. Halifax was incorporated as the City of Halifax in 1842.

Throughout the nineteenth century, there were numerous businesses that were developed in HRM that became of national and international importance: The Starr Manufacturing Company, the  Cunard Line, Alexander Keith's Brewery, Morse's Tea Company, among others.

Having played a key role to maintain and expand British power in North America and elsewhere during the 18th century, Halifax played less dramatic roles in the many decades of peace during the 19th Century. However, as one of the most important British overseas bases, the harbour's defences were successively refortified with the latest artillery defences throughout the century to provide a secure base for British Empire forces. Nova Scotians and Maritimers were recruited through Halifax for the Crimean War. The city boomed during the American Civil War, mostly by supplying the wartime economy of the North but also by offering refuge and supplies to Confederate blockade runners.  The port also saw Canada's first overseas military deployment as a nation to aid the British Empire during the Second Boer War.

Halifax was founded below a drumlin that would later be named Citadel Hill. The outpost was named in honour of George Montague-Dunk, 2nd Earl of Halifax, who was the President of the Board of Trade. Halifax was ideal for a military base, with the vast Halifax Harbour, among the largest natural harbours in the world, which could be well protected with artillery battery at McNab's Island, the Northwest Arm, Point Pleasant, George's Island and York Redoubt. In its early years, Citadel Hill was used as a command and observation post, before changes in artillery that could range out into the harbour.

Royal Acadian School
In 1814, Walter Bromley opened the Royal Acadian School which included many black students - children and adults - whom he taught on the weekends because they were employed during the week.  Some of the black students entered into business in Halifax while others were hired as servants.

New Horizons Baptist Church

New Horizons Baptist Church (formerly known as the African Chapel and the African Baptist Church) is a Baptist church in Halifax, Nova Scotia that was established by Black Refugees in 1832. When the chapel was completed, black citizens of Halifax were reported to be proud of this accomplishment because it was evidence that former slaves could establish their own institutions in Nova Scotia.  Under the direction of Richard Preston, the church laid the foundation for social action to address the plight of Black Nova Scotians.

Preston and others went on to establish a network of socially active Black baptist churches throughout Nova Scotia, with the Halifax church being referred to as the "Mother Church." Five of these churches were established in Halifax: Preston (1842), Beechville (1844), Hammonds Plains (1845), and another in Africville (1849) and Dartmouth. From meetings held at the church, they also established the African Friendly Society, the African Abolition Society, and the African United Baptist Association.

The church remained the centre of social activism throughout the 20th Century. Reverends at the church included William A. White (1919-1936) and William Pearly Oliver (1937-1962).

City status
After a protracted struggle between residents and the Viceroys of Nova Scotia, the City of Halifax was incorporated in 1842.

Responsible government

The cause of self-government for the city of Halifax began the political career of Joseph Howe and would subsequently lead to this form of accountability being brought to colonial affairs for the colony of Nova Scotia. Howe was later considered a great Nova Scotian leader, and the father of responsible government in British North America. After election to the House of Assembly as leader of the Liberal party, one of his first acts was the incorporation of the City of Halifax in 1842, followed by the direct election of civic politicians by Haligonians.

Halifax became a hotbed of political activism as the winds of responsible government swept British North America during the 1840s, following the rebellions against oligarchies in the colonies of Upper and Lower Canada.  The first instance of responsible government in the British Empire was achieved by the colony of Nova Scotia in January–February 1848 through the efforts of Howe. The leaders of the fight for responsible or self-government later took up the Anti-Confederation fight, the movement that from 1868 to 1875 tried to take Nova Scotia out of Confederation.

During the 1850s, Howe was a heavy promoter of railway technology, having been a key instigator in the founding of the Nova Scotia Railway, which ran from Richmond in the city's north end to the Minas Basin at Windsor and to Truro and on to Pictou on the Northumberland Strait. In the 1870s Halifax became linked by rail to Moncton and Saint John, New Brunswick through the Intercolonial Railway and on into Quebec and New England, not to mention numerous rural areas in Nova Scotia.

Crimean War

Citizens of the former City of Halifax fought in the Crimean War. The Welsford-Parker Monument in Halifax is the oldest war monument in Canada (1860) and the only Crimean War monument in North America.  It commemorates the Siege of Sevastopol (1854–1855).

Located at the mouth of the Sackville River, Bedford was originally known by several names, such as Fort Sackville, Ten Mile House, and Sunnyside. It used the name Bedford Basin (named after the Bedford Basin) from 1856 to 1902, when it was shortened to just Bedford, taking its name from the Duke of Bedford who was the Secretary of State in 1749.

Dartmouth saw a surge of local industries in the 1850s. The Dartmouth Marine Slips opened in 1858 just in time to benefit from the surge in shipping during the American Civil War. Nearby, the Starr Manufacturing Company was built near the Shubenacadie Canal in the late 1850s. The factory employed over 150 workers and manufactured ice skates, cut nails, vault doors, iron bridge work and other heavy iron products. The Mott's candy and soap factory, employing 100, opened at Hazelhurst (near present-day Hazelhurst and Newcastle Streets). The Symonds Foundry employed a further 50 to 100 people. The Stairs Ropeworks, later Consumer Cordage, was built in the North End of Dartmouth on Wyse Road, constructing an industrial suburb for its 300 workers and surviving the Halifax Explosion. The ropeworks survived as a pub until 2012 when it was demolished by Sobeys to construct a supermarket. As the population grew, more houses were erected and new businesses established. Subdivisions such as Woodlawn, Woodside and Westphal developed on the outskirts of the town.

Military schools
Long before the Royal Military College of Canada was established in 1876, there were proposals for military colleges in Canada. At a pre-Confederation of Canada military school in Halifax, adult male students drilled and attended lectures on drill commands, military records, court-martial, the Articles of War, discipline and punishments, promotion of non-commissioned officers, military accounts and pay and messing. After Confederation, a military school was opened in Halifax to conduct officer training for cavalry, infantry and artillery. In 1870–71, Canadian militia staff replaced the British regulars who were recalled from overseas station.

Schools for the Deaf and the Blind established

The first school for the deaf in Atlantic Canada, the Halifax School for the Deaf, was established on Göttingen Street, Halifax (1856). The Halifax School for the Blind was opened on Morris Street in 1871. It was the first residential school for the blind in Canada.

American Civil War
The American Civil War again saw much activity and prosperity in Halifax. Due to longstanding economic and social connections to New England as well as the Abolition movement, a majority of the population supported the North and many volunteered to fight in the Union Army. However, parts of the city's merchant class, especially those trading in the West Indies, supported the Confederates. A few merchants in the city made huge profits selling supplies and sometimes arms to both sides of the conflict (see for example Alexander Keith, Jr.). Confederate ships often called on the port to take on supplies, and make repairs. Halifax played a significant role in the Chesapeake Affair. Another Confederate ship, became a notable in Halifax when she made a midnight escape through from Union warships believed waiting at the harbour entrance.

The Tallahassee Escape
Just before arriving in Halifax, CSS Tallahassee made a 19-day raid off the Atlantic coast. Tallahassee destroyed 26 vessels and captured 7 others that were bonded or released. Under the command of John Taylor Wood sailed into Halifax Harbour for supplies, coal and to make repairs to her mainmast. Wood began loading coal at Woodside, on the Dartmouth shore. Two Union Navy ships were closing in on Tallahassee, USS Nansemont and USS Huron. While Wood was offered an escort out of the harbour he instead slipped out of the harbour under the cover of night by going through the seldom used Eastern Passage between McNab's Island and the Dartmouth Shore.  The channel was narrow and crooked with a shallow tide so Wood hired the local pilot Jock Flemming. Tallahassee left the Woodside wharf at night in darkness. All the lights were out, but the residents on the Eastern Passage mainland could see the dark hull moving through the water, successfully evading capture.

Confederation
After the American Civil War, the five colonies which made up British North America, Ontario, Quebec, Prince Edward Island, Nova Scotia and New Brunswick, held meetings to consider uniting into a single country. This was due to a threat of annexation and invasion from the United States. Canadian Confederation became a reality in 1867, but received much resistance from the merchant classes of Halifax, and from many prominent Halifax politicians due to the fact that both Halifax and Nova Scotia were at the time very wealthy, held trading ties with Boston and New York which would be damaged, and did not see the need for the colony to give up its comparative independence. After confederation Halifax retained its British military garrison until British troops were replaced by the Canadian army in 1906. The British Royal Navy remained until 1910 when the newly created Royal Canadian Navy took over the Naval Dockyard.

The city's cultural roots deepened as its economy matured. The Victorian College of Art was founded in 1887 (later to become the Nova Scotia College of Art and Design.)  Local artist John O'Brien excelled at portraits of the city's ships, yacht races and seascapes. The province's Public Archives and the provincial museum were founded in this period (first called the Mechanic's Institute, later the Nova Scotia Museum.)

Post Confederation

After Confederation, boosters of Halifax expected federal help to make the city's natural harbor Canada's official winter port and a gateway for trade with Europe. Halifax's advantages included its location just off the Great Circle route made it the closest to Europe of any mainland North American port. But the new Intercolonial Railway (ICR) took an indirect, northerly route for military and political reasons. Although the ICR did built a large new station and some port facilities known as the Deep Water Terminals in Halifax's North End, the national government made little effort to promote Halifax as Canada's winter port. Ignoring appeals to nationalism and the ICR's own attempts to promote traffic to Halifax, most Canadian exporters sent their wares by train though Boston or Portland. Port promoters fought an uphill battle for decades to finance the large-scale port facilities that Halifax needed. It took the First World War to at last boost Halifax's harbor into prominence on the North Atlantic.

Industrialization
Halifax business leaders attempted to diversity with manufacturing under Canada's National Policy creating factories such as the Acadia Sugar Refinery, the Nova Scotia Cotton Manufacturing Company, the Halifax Graving Dock and the Silliker Car Works. However, this embrace with industrialization produced only modest results as most Halifax manufacturers found it hard to compete with larger firms in Ontario and Quebec.

Transportation links to Dartmouth

In 1873 Dartmouth was incorporated as a town and a Town Hall was established in 1877. In 1883 The Dartmouth Times began publishing. In 1885 a railway station was built, and the first passenger service starts in 1886 with branch lines running to Windsor Junction by 1896 and the Eastern Shore by 1904.  Two attempts were made to bridge The Narrows of Halifax Harbour with a railway line during the 1880s but were washed away by powerful storms. These attempts were abandoned after the line to Windsor Junction was completed. The line running through Dartmouth was envisioned to continue along the Eastern Shore to Canso or Guysborough, however developers built it inland along the Musquodoboit River at Musquodoboit Harbour and it ended in the Musquodoboit Valley farming settlement of Upper Musquodoboit, ending Dartmouth's vision of becoming a railway hub.

Salvation Army

En route to England, George Scott Railton stopped at the port of Halifax, Nova Scotia and held the first Salvation Army meeting in Canada on March 24, 1881. He was so engaged in his sermon he missed his boat to England. He preached in Halifax for the following week in various Halifax churches and a year later the Salvation Army was officially established in Canada.

Anna Leonowens
Anna Leonowens lived in Halifax, Nova Scotia for nineteen years (1878-1897) and had a significant cultural and social impact on the city. Her daughter Avis Annie Crawford Connybeare married Thomas Fyshe, the cashier (general manager) of the Bank of Nova Scotia in Halifax. She was a stanch supporter of women's education, organizing and serving as librarian for the Pioneer Book Club and her Shakespeare Club for young women. She was also one of the founders of the Local Council of Women of Halifax and the Woman's Suffrage Association, both of which advocated for the right for women to vote.  She also was a founder of the Nova Scotia College of Art and Design. After nineteen years, her daughter and family moved to Montreal, Quebec, Leonowens followed her there.

North-West Rebellion
 
Prior to Nova Scotia's involvement in the North-West Rebellion, Canada's "first war", the province remained hostile to Canada in the aftermath of the how the colony was forced into Canada.  The celebration that followed the Halifax Provisional Battalion's return from the conflict by train across the county ignited a national patriotism in Nova Scotia.  Prime Minister Robert Borden, stated that "up to this time Nova Scotia hardly regarded itself as included in the Canadian Confederation... The rebellion evoked a new spirit... The Riel Rebellion did more to unite Nova Scotia with the rest of Canada than any event that had occurred since Confederation."  Similarly, in 1907 Governor General Earl Grey declared, "This Battalion... went out Nova Scotians, they returned Canadians." The wrought iron gates at the Halifax Public Gardens were made in the Battalion's honour.

20th century

Second Boer War

During the Second Boer War (1899–1902), the First Contingent was composed of seven companies from across Canada. The Nova Scotia Company (H) consisted of 125 men. (The total First Contingent was a total force of 1,019. Eventually over 8,600 Canadians served.) The mobilization of the Contingent took place at Quebec. On October 30, 1899, the ship Sardinian sailed the troops for four weeks to Cape Town. The Boer War marked the first occasion in which large contingents of Nova Scotian troops served abroad (individual Nova Scotians had served in the Crimean War).

The Battle of Paardeberg in February 1900 represented the second time Canadian soldiers saw battle abroad (the first being the Canadian involvement in the Nile Expedition). Canadians also saw action at the Battle of Faber's Put on May 30, 1900. On November 7, 1900, the Royal Canadian Dragoons engaged the Boers in the Battle of Leliefontein, where they saved British guns from capture during a retreat from the banks of the Komati River. Approximately 267 Canadians died in the war. 89 men were killed in action, 135 died of disease, and the remainder died of accident or injury. 252 were wounded.

Halifax and Southwestern Railway
In 1901, Halifax and Southwestern Railway (H&SW) was planned. The railway would run from Halifax to Yarmouth along the province's South Shore. In the years before the domination of publicly funded highways, the H&SW would form a critical transportation link between the various communities, as well as steam ship connections at Yarmouth (to Boston and New York) and Halifax (to Europe). Construction was completed in 1906 and H&SW tracks joined the Intercolonial Railway's mainline in Halifax at Southwestern Junction at Africville and ran into the Intercolonial's North Street Station. On December 19, 1906 the first H&SW through train reached Yarmouth from Halifax. At some point during the period following completion of the H&SW in 1906, the system was merged into Canadian Northern Railway (CNoR) transcontinental system.  The H&SW, along with the Inverness Railway, were isolated from the rest of CNoR's trackage which ran from Montreal to Vancouver, not unlike rival Canadian Pacific Railway's Dominion Atlantic Railway.

The CNR, along with several other railway lines in Canada, entered financial difficulties during the First World War.  Encumbered by construction debts and low traffic, the CNoR was bankrupt and requested financial aid from the federal government in 1918. On September 6, 1918, CNoR was nationalized and placed under a Board of Management by the Department of Railways and Canals.  On December 20, 1918, CNoR, along with the Canadian Government Railways were placed under a new company named Canadian National Railways (CNR).

Titanic disaster

The city was the closest to the disaster site with direct rail and steamship connections. Two Halifax-based ships,  and CS Minia, were sent to recover the bodies still floating in the North Atlantic. Mackay-Bennett was the first ship to reach the disaster area and retrieved most of the bodies that were recovered.

Only 333 bodies of Titanic victims were recovered, one in five of the over 1,500 victims. (Titanic carried 2,224 passengers and crew.) A large temporary morgue was set up in the curling rink of the Mayflower Curling Club and the present-day Maritime Conservatory of Performing Arts building.  The majority of recovered victims, 150 bodies, were buried in three Halifax cemeteries, 121 being buried in Fairview Lawn Cemetery followed by the nearby Mount Olivet and Baron de Hirsch cemeteries.  Relatives from across North America came to identify and claim the remaining bodies.

World War I

An important port for the Caribbean-Canada-United Kingdom shipping triangle during the 19th century, Halifax's strategic harbour was also an integral part of Allied war efforts during both world wars.

It was in World War I that Halifax would truly come into its own as a world class port and naval facility in the steamship era. The strategic location of the port with its protective waters of Bedford Basin sheltered convoys from German U-boat attack prior to heading into the open Atlantic Ocean. Halifax's railway connections with the Intercolonial Railway of Canada and its port facilities became vital to the British war effort during the First World War as Canada's industrial centres churned out material for the Western Front. In 1914, Halifax began playing a major role in World War I, both as the departure point for Canadian soldiers heading overseas, and as an assembly point for all convoys (a responsibility which would be placed on the city again during World War II). The city also served as the return point for wounded soldiers returning on hospital ships. A new generation of gun batteries, searchlights and an anti-submarine net defended the harbour, manned by a large garrison of soldiers. The United States Navy established a naval air station on August 19, 1918 to operate seaplanes. The base closed shortly after the First Armistice at Compiègne. Halifax's limited 19th century housing and transit facilities were heavily burdened. In November 1917, a subway system plan was presented to City Hall, but the city did not pursue the scheme.

Halifax Explosion

The war was seen as a blessing for the city's economy, but in 1917 a French munitions ship, collided with a Norwegian ship, . The collision sparked a fire on the munitions ship which was filled with 2,300 tons of wet and dry picric acid (used for making lyddite for artillery shells), 200 tons of trinitrotoluene (TNT), 10 tons of gun cotton, with drums of Benzol (High Octane fuel) stacked on her deck. On December 6, 1917, at 9:04:35 AM the munitions ship exploded in what was the largest man-made explosion before the first testing of an atomic bomb, and is still one of the largest non-nuclear man-made explosions. The Halifax Explosion decimated the city's north end, killing roughly 2,000 inhabitants, injuring 9,000, and leaving tens of thousands homeless and without shelter.

The following day a blizzard hit the city, hindering recovery efforts. Immediate help rushed in from the rest of Nova Scotia, New Brunswick, Prince Edward Island, and Newfoundland. In the following week more relief from other parts of North America arrived and donations were sent from around the world. The most celebrated effort came from the Boston Red Cross and the Massachusetts Public Safety Committee; as an enduring thank-you, since 1971 the province of Nova Scotia has donated the annual Christmas tree lit at the Boston Common in Boston.

The explosion and the rebuilding which followed had important impacts on the city: reshaping the layout of North End neighbourhoods; creating a progressive housing development known as the Hydrostone; and hastening the move of railways to the South End of the city.

Interwar period

The city's economy slumped after the war, although reconstruction from the Halifax Explosion brought new housing and infrastructure as well as the establishment of the Halifax Shipyard. However, a tremendous drop in worldwide shipping following the war as well as the failure of regional industries in the 1920s brought hard-times to the city, further aggravated by the Great Depression in 1929. One bright spot was the completion of Ocean Terminals and the Pier 21 immigration complex in the city's south end, a large modern complex to trans-ship freight and passengers from steamships to railways. The harbour's strategic location made the city the base for the famous and successful salvage tug  which brought lucrative salvage jobs to the city in the 1930s. While a military airport had been in operation at Dartmouth's Shearwater base since World War I, the city opened its first civilian airport in the city's West End at Chebucto Field in 1931. Pan-Am began international flights from Boston in 1932.

War Plan Red, a military strategy developed by the United States Army during the mid-1920s and officially withdrawn in 1939, involved an occupation of Halifax by US forces following a poison gas first strike, to deny the British a major naval base and cut links between Britain and Canada.

World War II

Halifax played an even bigger role in the Allied naval war effort of World War II.  The only theatre of War to be commanded by a Canadian was the North Western Atlantic, commanded from Halifax by Rear-Admiral Leonard W. Murray. Halifax became a lifeline for preserving Britain during the Nazi onslaught of the Battle of Britain and the Battle of the Atlantic, the supplies helping to offset a threatened amphibious invasion by Germany. Many convoys assembled in Bedford Basin to deliver supplies to troops in Europe. The city's railway links fed large numbers of troopships building up Allied armies in Europe. The harbour became an essential base for Canadian, British and other Allied warships. Very much a front-line city, civilians lived with the fears of possible German raids or another accidental ammunition explosion. Well-defended, the city was never attacked although some merchant ships and two small naval vessels were sunk at the outer approaches to the harbour. However, the sounds and sometimes the flames of these distant attacks fed wartime rumours, some of which linger to the present day of imaginary tales of German U-boats entering Halifax Harbour. The city's housing, retail and public transit infrastructure, small and neglected after 20 years of prewar economic stagnation was severely stressed. Severe housing and recreational problems simmered all through the war and culminated in the Halifax Riot on VE Day in May 1945. The war was also marked by a massive explosion of the Navy's Bedford ammunition magazine which accidentally blew up on July 18, 1945 causing the evacuation of the north end of Halifax and Dartmouth and fears of another Halifax Explosion.

Bedford Magazine Explosion

During World War II Dartmouth as with Halifax was busy supporting Canada's war effort in Europe. On July 18, 1945, at the end of World War II, a fire broke out at the magazine jetty on the Bedford Basin, north of Dartmouth. The fire began on a sunken barge and quickly spread to the dock. A violent series of large explosions ensued as stored ammunition exploded. The barge responsible for starting the explosion presently lies on the seabed near the eastern shoreline adjacent to the Magazine Dock.

Halifax Riot
The Halifax Riot happened on VE-Day, May 7–8, 1945 in Halifax and Dartmouth, Nova Scotia began as a celebration of the World War II Victory in Europe. This rapidly declined into a rampage by several thousand servicemen, merchant seamen and civilians, who looted the City of Halifax. Although a subsequent Royal Commission chaired by Justice Roy Kellock blamed lax naval authority and specifically Rear-Admiral Leonard W. Murray, it is generally accepted that the underlying causes were a combination of bureaucratic confusion, insufficient policing and antipathy between the military and civilians, fueled by the presence of 25,000 servicemen who had strained Halifax wartime resources to the limit.

Postwar years
After World War II, Halifax did not experience the postwar economic malaise it had so often experienced after previous wars. This was partially due to the Cold War which required continued spending on a modern Canadian navy. However, the city also benefited from a more diverse economy and postwar growth in government services and education. The 1960s–1990s saw less suburban sprawl than in many comparable Canadian cities in the areas surrounding Halifax. This was partly as a result of local geographies and topography (Halifax is extremely hilly with exposed granite not conducive to construction), a weaker regional and local economy, and a smaller population base than, for example, central Canada or New England. There were also deliberate local government policies to limit not only suburban growth but also put some controls on growth in the central business district to address concerns from heritage advocates.

The late 1960s was a period of significant change and expansion of the city when surrounding areas of Halifax County were amalgamated into Halifax: Rockingham, Clayton Park, Fairview, Armdale, and Spryfield were all added in 1969.

A desire to promote development by Halifax downtown business interests proposed demolishing the Halifax Citadel and leveling Citadel Hill to provide parking and encourage development in the late 1940s. However, recognition of the fort's historical significance and tourism potential led to the fort's preservation in 1956 and gradual restoration by Parks Canada as a city landmark and top tourism draw.

Urban renewal plans in the 1960s and 1970s resulted in the loss of much of its heritage architecture and community fabric in large downtown developments such as the Scotia Square mall and office towers. However, a citizens protest movement limited further destructive plans such as a waterfront freeway called Harbour Drive, which opened the way for a popular and successful revitalized waterfront. A remainder of the cancelled freeway plan is the Cogswell Interchange.

Selective height limits were also achieved to protect the views from Citadel Hill. However, municipal heritage protection remained weak with only pockets of heritage buildings surviving in the downtown and constant pressure from developers for further demolition. Selective height restrictions were adopted to protect views from Citadel Hill which triggered battles over proposed developments that would fill vacant lots or add height to existing historical structures.

Another casualty during the 1960s and 1970s period of expansion and urban renewal was the Black community of Africville which was declared a slum, demolished and its residents displaced to clear land for industrial use as well as for the A. Murray MacKay Bridge. The repercussions continue to this day and a 2001 United Nations report has called for reparations be paid to the community's former residents.

In 1980, Bedford incorporated as a separate municipality (a town).

Restrictions on development were relaxed somewhat during the 1990s, resulting in some suburban sprawl off the peninsula. Today the community of Halifax is more compact than most Canadian urban areas although expanses of suburban growth have occurred in neighbouring Dartmouth, Bedford and Sackville.  One development in the late 1990s was the Bayers Lake Business Park, where warehouse style retailers were permitted to build in a suburban industrial park west of Rockingham. This has become an important yet controversial centre of commerce for the city and the province as it used public infrastructure to subsidise multi-national retail chains and draw business from local downtown business.  Much of this subsidy was due to competition between Halifax, Bedford and Dartmouth to host these giant retail chains and this controversy helped lead the province to force amalgamation as a way to end wasteful municipal rivalries.  In the past few years, urban housing sprawl has even reached these industrial/retail parks as new blasting techniques permitted construction on the granite wilderness around the city.  What was once a business park surrounded by forest and a highway on one side has become a large suburb with numerous new apartment buildings and condominiums. Some of this growth has been spurred by offshore oil and natural gas economic activity but much has been due to a population shift from rural Nova Scotian communities to the Halifax urban area. The new amalgamated city has attempted to manage this growth with a new master development plan.

1996 amalgamation and Community status
The provincial government had sought to reduce the number of municipal governments in the province as a cost-saving measure. In 1992, a task force was created to pursue this cutback.

In 1995, the Act to Incorporate the Halifax Regional Municipality received Royal Assent in the provincial legislature. On 1 April 1996, the Town of Bedford, the City of Dartmouth, the City of Halifax, and the County of Halifax were dissolved, and the Halifax Regional Municipality was created.

Although the amalgamation dissolved the aforementioned cities, suburbs, towns, and villages, residents of the former-places commonly refer to their locality their respective community (use of the colloquial term city is used for residents of Dartmouth-and-Halifax), and not as resident of the Halifax Regional Municipality. (E.g. if a person asks where they live in Nova Scotia, the person will say they are from Dartmouth--not from the Halifax Regional Municipality).

21st century

During the mid-to-late 1990s HRM developed a strong national and international following to its music scene, particularly the alternative genre. Musical acts from HRM include such notable groups as: Sloan, The Nellis Complex, Thrush Hermit, Christina Clark and Sarah McLachlan.

Although discussions had been underway for decades in the former cities of Halifax and Dartmouth, a deal was finally signed in 2003 that saw the construction of several sewage treatment plants for the core urban area, as well as an extensive trunk collector system to link outfalls to each plant. For the first time since settlement came to the area, human sewage will be treated before it is discharged into the Atlantic Ocean; estimated start-up is for 2007.

Hurricane Juan
On September 29, 2003, HRM was hit by Hurricane Juan which made landfall west of the urban core. Juan was the most powerful hurricane to directly hit the Halifax-Dartmouth metropolitan area since 1893. The storm caused a serious disruption throughout the central and eastern part of the municipality during the first week of October. Although some areas of the urban core only lost electricity for a brief period, outlying rural regions in the eastern part of HRM were without electricity for up to two weeks. Millions of trees in HRM were damaged or destroyed in the dense forests along the Eastern Shore.

On January 13, 2008 the government of Nova Scotia proclaimed the "Halifax Regional Municipality Charter Act" giving the municipality more powers to address the specific needs of HRM.

Africville Apology

On February 24, 2010, Halifax Mayor Peter J. Kelly made the Africville Apology, apologizing for the eviction of those from Africville as part of a $4.5-million compensation deal. The city restored the name Africville to Seaview Park at the annual Africville Family Reunion on July 29, 2011. The Seaview African United Baptist Church, demolished in 1969, was rebuilt in the summer of 2011 to serve as a church and interpretation centre. The nearly complete church was ceremonially opened on September 25, 2011.

Geography
The community's total landmass is 6,196.1 hectares (61.961 km2). It accounts for less than 1.2% of the municipal landmass, and less than 27% of the urban landmass.

The community is located in the Atlantic Maritime ecozone, the Appalachian land-form region, and the wet-climate soil-region. Furthermore, Halifax is within the Atlantic Canada climate-region, and the Mixwood-forest vegetation-region.

Historical political geography

The original settlements of Halifax occupied a small stretch of land inside a palisade at the foot of Citadel Hill on the Halifax Peninsula, a sub-peninsula of the much larger Chebucto Peninsula that extends into Halifax Harbour.  Over time, Halifax grew to incorporate all of the north, south, and west ends of the peninsula with a central business district concentrated in the southeastern end along the Narrows.

In 1969, the City of Halifax grew significantly. The City annexed several communities from the surrounding Halifax County; Armdale, Clayton Park, Fairview, Purcell's Cove, Rockingham, and Spryfield.

On 1 April 1996, the City of Dartmouth, City of Halifax, County of Halifax, and the Town of Bedford amalgamated and formed the Halifax Regional Municipality. Subsequently, the City of Halifax dissolved, and was reestablished as the Community of Halifax. The new community is coterminous with the former City.

The streets on the Halifax peninsula are a grid and numbered sequentially making it easy to get around.  Numbered from south-to-north House Numbers start at 1 and reach 1000 block at Inglis Street, 2000 block at Quinpool Road, 3000 block at Almon Street and 4000 block at Duffus Street. Moving from east-to-west 5000 block is at Lower Water Street, 6000 block at Robie Street. One of the longest streets on the peninsula is Robie Street. When looking for 2010 Robie Street look one block north of Quinpool Road across from the Halifax Commons, move a block to the west and you will find 2010 Windsor Street; walk a few more blocks west and Quinpool will take you to 2010 Oxford Street. If you are moving west on Almon Street you will find 5200 Almon at the Göttingen Street intersection, 6000 Almon at Robie, 7000 Almon at Connaught Avenue, Chebucto Road numbers to 8000 at Joseph Howe Drive. The numbering system is consistent to the grid even when the streets are not perfectly parallel or perpendicular to one another on the map.

Neighbourhoods

Colloquial neighbourhood names
 North End Halifax, north of North Street to Seaview Park
 West End, Halifax, West of Windsor Street, between North and South Streets to Joseph Howe Drive
 Quinpool District, Shopping and Dining area
 South End Halifax, South of South Street to Point Pleasant Park
 Spring Garden, shopping and dining area
 Central Halifax, the original city, between North Street and South Street, from Lower-Water Street to Windsor Street

Official neighbourhood names
(including former villages, residential neighbourhoods; and modern names of housing developments and industrial parks)
 Armdale, village neighbourhood
 Bayer's Lake
 Beechwood Park
 Boulderwood
 Bridgeview
 Clayton Park
 Convoy Place
 Cowie Hill
 Fairmount
 Fairview, village neighbourhood
 Fernleigh
 Green Acres
 Hydrostone post Halifax Explosion re-development neighbourhood
 Jollimore, village neighbourhood
 Kent Park
 Leiblin Park
 Melville Cove
 Mulgrave Park, housing development in Mulgrave district
 Rockingham, village neighbourhood
 Sherwood Heights
 Spryfield, village neighbourhood
 Thornhill
 Wedgewood
 Westmount Subdivision

Historic neighbourhood names
 Africville, now Seaview Park
 Richmond, now The North End east of Novalea Drive facing the harbour.
 Mulgrave (Halifax), north of Duffus Street, east of Göttingen Street in the North End.
 Needham (Halifax), now The Hydrostone and much of the North End west of Novalea Drive.
 Dutch Village, The West End west of Windsor Street
 Fort Massey, East of Robie Street from Duke Street to South Street

Richmond, Needham and Mulgrave were voting district names. Historically, these working-class Catholic neighbourhoods used their parish names: Saint Stephen's, Saint Joeseph's, Saint Patrick's. Today they are the integrated and prosperous North End; the neighbourhood names are no longer in common use and the parish boundaries no longer exist.

Demographics
Currently, the Community's is at its highest ever population. Within its relatively small landmass, there are 156,141 inhabitants as of 2021.

From 2016 to 2021, the community's population increased by 19,621 people; from 136,520 people to 156,141 people. The increase represented very-strong growth of higher-than 14% over a time-period of five-years.

The community of Halifax consists of census tracts 2050001.00 to 2050027.00.

See also

List of mayors of Halifax, Nova Scotia
 List of people from the Halifax Regional Municipality
History of Dartmouth
Military history of Nova Scotia
 History of Nova Scotia
Black Nova Scotians

References
Endnotes

Sources

Further reading
 
  
 
 
 
 
 L. D. Mccann; Elaine Young: Halifax at The Canadian Encyclopedia, 2019

Primary sources
 Thomas Atkins. Papers related to the first settlement of Halifax (1749-1756)
Letter from British settler. July 1749. London Magazine

External links
 Akins, Thomas B., History of Halifax, 1895.
 HRM History
 Government House – Halifax, Nova Scotia

History of Halifax, Nova Scotia
History of Nova Scotia by location
Military history of Nova Scotia
History of Nova Scotia
Populated places established in 1749
Populated places disestablished in 1996
Conflicts in Nova Scotia